Paul Giguet (25 April 1915 – 28 September 1993) was a French racing cyclist. He rode in the 1947, 1948 and 1949 Tour de France.

References

External links

1915 births
1993 deaths
French male cyclists
Cyclists from Paris